Cheri Viswanath (9 August 1933 – 9 September 2014) was a South indian screenwriter, playwright, lyricist and journalist.

Biography
Many of his works were written under the pen name Cheri, which is derived from the name of his family Cheriyil in Kollam District in South India.

He started his career as a playwright and journalist and was associated with the famous theatre group in South India called Kalanilayam.

In a literary career spanning over 45 years, he had written 16 novels, 25 dramas and 19 radio plays and several lyrics for Malayalam movies.

His song for the movie Thaalappoly (1977) was the biggest hit of the year.

He had written screenplays for 20 feature films, directed by veteran film makers M.Krishnan Nair, Madhu, Crossbelt Mani and M.Mani.

Viswanath worked as the Chief Editor for the Malayalam Dailies Thaniniram and Yeenadu for 45 years.

He is the father of award-winning international film maker Biju Viswanath and Priya Prakash, Veena Player.

Major works

Plays

Screenplays

Radioplays
Ezhu Sundara Rathrikal 1979 (Seven Wonderful Nights)
Sasthram Prathikuttil 1980 (Science in the Accused Stand)
Porutham 1980 (Harmony)
Tharavadinte Manam 1981 (Family Honour)
Siksha 1981 (Punishment)
Punarvivaham 1983 (Remarriage)
Nandi Veendum Varilla 1986 (Thanks I Won't Come Again)
Doctor, Collector, Engineer 1986
Packup 1992

Kadhaprasangam
Neelasari (Blue Sari) 1969 (Kollam Babu)
Marble Sundari (Marble Beauty) 1971 (Kundara Soman)
Swayamvaram (Marriage) 1972 (Kundara Soman)
Punarjanmam (Rebirth) 1973(Kundara Soman)
Christ 1975 (Chenganoor Thankachan)
Neelavelicham (Blue Light) 1976 (Viswambharam)
Devatha (Goddess) 1977 (Chitaranjan Bhagavatar)

Novels
Avivahithayaya Bharya 1962 (Unmarried Wife)
Ladies Hostel 1963
Snehabandam 1965 (Love Affair)
 Vivahasammanam 1966 (Wedding Gift)
Kamadhenu 1967 (Wish Cow)
Kanaljalam 1968 (Mirage)
Randam Madhuvidhu 1970 (Second Honey Moon)
Daivam Veetil Vannirunnu 1971 (God Came to House)
Neelasari 1972 (Blue Sari)
Melottu ozhukumma Puzha 1985 (The River That Flows Upwards)

References

External links

 mathrubhumi daily

1933 births
2014 deaths
Writers from Kollam
Malayali people
Malayalam-language dramatists and playwrights
Journalists from Kerala
Malayalam screenwriters
Malayalam-language lyricists
Indian male dramatists and playwrights
20th-century Indian dramatists and playwrights
20th-century Indian journalists
Screenwriters from Kerala
20th-century Indian male writers